Anthony Joseph Francis (born May 7, 1990) is an American professional wrestler, musician and former American football player. He is currently signed to WWE where he performs on the SmackDown brand under the ring name Top Dolla and is a member of the stable, Hit Row. He was signed by the Miami Dolphins as an undrafted free agent in 2013. Francis played college football at Maryland. Francis also played for the Seattle Seahawks and Washington Redskins. He is the host of WWE's Most Wanted Treasures.

Professional football career

Miami Dolphins
After going un-drafted in the 2013 NFL Draft, Francis signed with the Miami Dolphins on April 30, 2013.

New England Patriots
The New England Patriots claimed Francis off waivers on September 1, 2013. He was released on September 7, only to be signed to the team's practice squad three days later. Francis remained on the practice squad until being re-signed by the Dolphins in November.

Miami Dolphins (second stint)
On November 27, 2013, Francis was signed off the Patriots' practice squad.

Francis was put on injured reserve on August 27, 2014. On November 14, 2015, he was waived by the Dolphins.

Seattle Seahawks
On November 16, 2015, Francis was acquired off waivers by the Seattle Seahawks. On November 24, he was released by the team, but signed to the practice squad two days later. On November 30, 2015, he chose to be promoted to the active roster in Seattle over resigning with the Dolphins to their active roster. On March 8, 2016, Francis signed his one-year exclusive-rights tender deal to return to Seattle.

Tampa Bay Buccaneers
On May 17, 2016 Francis signed with the Tampa Bay Buccaneers. He was waived by the Buccaneers on September 3, 2016.

Washington Redskins
On October 12, 2016 Francis signed with the Washington Redskins. He was promoted to the active roster on November 29, 2016. He was waived on December 10, 2016, and was re-signed back to the practice squad. Francis signed a futures contract with the Redskins on January 2, 2017.

On September 2, 2017, Francis was waived by the Redskins. He was re-signed to their practice squad on October 18, 2017, and was promoted to the active roster the next day. He was waived on October 25, 2017. He was re-signed on November 21, 2017.

Francis was waived on April 30, 2018. After his release, Francis publicly stated he was grateful that he was no longer a part of team due to the organization's lack of appreciation for him and adding his view that the team's mascot was racist.

New York Giants
On May 2, 2018, Francis signed with the New York Giants. He was released on September 1, 2018 and not signed by any other teams in the 2018–2019 season.

Professional wrestling career 

Francis signed with WWE in January 2020. Francis made his wrestling television debut on the May 4, 2021, episode of NXT where he aligned himself with Isaiah "Swerve" Scott by helping him defeat Leon Ruff in a Falls Count Anywhere match, establishing himself as a heel in the process. The following week, Francis was introduced as Top Dolla and formed a new stable, Hit Row with Scott, Ashante "Thee" Adonis, and B-Fab. Despite Top Dolla being drafted to SmackDown along with the rest of Hit Row as a part of the 2021 WWE Draft, B-Fab was released on November 4, and the rest of Hit Row were released 15 days due to the COVID-19 pandemic.

On the August 12, 2022, episode of SmackDown, Top Dolla made his unannounced return to WWE with Hit Row where he and Adonis (accompanied by B-Fab) defeated two local competitors. On the December 16 episode of SmackDown, Top Dolla and Adonis won their first main roster championship opportunity for the Undisputed WWE Tag Team Championship by defeating The Viking Raiders and Legado Del Fantasma in a triple threat tag team match. On the December 23 episode of SmackDown, Undisputed WWE Tag Team Champions The Usos beat Top Dolla and Adonis to retain the championship. 

On the January 6, 2023 episode of SmackDown, Top Dolla was defeated in a Royal Rumble qualifying match by Ricochet. After the match, Top Dolla, Adonis and B-Fab attacked Ricochet, turning Hit Row heel for the first time on the main roster.

Other media
In April 2021, Francis began starring in the A&E series WWE's Most Wanted Treasures as the historical expert where he travels with WWE Legends as they search for lost memorabilia from private collectors, museums and occasionally other WWE Legends.

Personal life

In April 2015, Francis went viral for signing up to be an Uber driver in the off-season, while playing for the Miami Dolphins.

References

External links
Maryland Terrapins bio
Miami Dolphins bio
New England Patriots bio
 

1990 births
Living people
Players of American football from Washington, D.C.
American football defensive tackles
Gonzaga College High School alumni
Maryland Terrapins football players
Miami Dolphins players
New England Patriots players
Seattle Seahawks players
Tampa Bay Buccaneers players
Washington Redskins players
New York Giants players
African-American male professional wrestlers
Professional wrestlers from Washington, D.C.
21st-century African-American sportspeople
21st-century professional wrestlers